Eminler is a village in the central district (Karaman) of Karaman Province, Turkey. At   it is situated to the west of Karadağ, an extinct volcano. The population of the village was 135  as of 2011. A tumulus in the village indicate that the village was an ancient settlement which was abandoned. The present village was founded by Circassians from the Caucasus after the ethnic cleansing of Circassians by the Russian Empire in the second half of the 19th century. The main economic activities of the village are agriculture and animal breeding. Main crops are cereals.

References

External links
Images

Villages in Karaman Central District